Guajará River may refer to:

 Guajará River (Amazon), a right tributary of the Amazon in the state of Pará, Brazil
 Guajará River (Marajó), a river on the island of Marajó in the state of Pará, Brazil